"XXX's and OOO's (An American Girl)" is a song written by Matraca Berg and Alice Randall, and recorded by American country music singer Trisha Yearwood. It was released in June 1994 as the lead single from her album Thinkin' About You. The song became her second number-one hit on the US country chart and her first since "She's in Love with the Boy" in 1991. The single also peaked at number 14 on the Bubbling Under Hot 100 chart and number one on the Canadian Country singles chart. It is the theme song to her Food Network show Trisha's Southern Kitchen.

Content
The song is narrated by Yearwood and tells the story of a young woman who has dreams and ambitions, but also discusses how she works hard and is a simple American girl who "signs her letters with XXX's and OOO's". She dreams of becoming successful in a man's world, citing her father as an example. The chorus verifies how the woman is a simple American girl.

In the song, there are references to R&B/soul singer Aretha Franklin and country singer Patsy Cline.

The song was also the theme to a television pilot titled XXX's and OOO's, which was pitched to CBS in late 1994.

Critical reception
Deborah Evans Price, of Billboard magazine reviewed the song unfavorably, saying that the song is obviously supposed to mean something, "with its rapid-fire scheme and assertive-woman references." She goes on to say that the song ends up "sounding like exactly what it is - the theme to a bad television show."

Charts
"XXX's and OOO's (An American Girl)" debuted at number 73 on the U.S. Billboard Hot Country Singles & Tracks chart for the week of July 9, 1994.

Year-end charts

References

1994 singles
1994 songs
Trisha Yearwood songs
Songs written by Matraca Berg
Song recordings produced by Garth Fundis
MCA Records singles